Dame Lois Joan Muir  (née Osborne; born 16 April 1935) is a New Zealand netball coach and administrator, and a former representative netball and basketball player. Muir represented New Zealand in two sports, playing with the Tall Ferns from 1952 to 1962 and the Silver Ferns from 1960 to 1963. She later became head coach of the Silver Ferns for 15 years from 1974 to 1988.

During this time she coached the Silver Ferns to World Championships gold in 1979 (jointly with Australia and Trinidad and Tobago) and in 1987.

Born in Mataura on 16 April 1935, Muir was educated at Gore High School, and then Otago Girls' High School in Dunedin. In 1955, she married Murray Muir, and the couple went on to have three children.

Muir was appointed an Officer of the Order of the British Empire, for services to netball, in the 1984 New Year Honours, and was inducted into the New Zealand Sports Hall of Fame in 1993. With the start of the Coca-Cola Cup (later the National Bank Cup) in 1998, she became coach of the Capital Shakers team.

In August 1998, Muir was diagnosed with breast cancer. She continued to coach the Shakers until the end of the 2000 season. She also took up a coaching position with the Otago Rebels until the end of 2005.

In the 2004 Queen's Birthday Honours, Muir was appointed as a Distinguished Companion of the New Zealand Order of Merit in recognition of services to sports administration and netball. She accepted redesignation as a Dame Companion of the New Zealand Order of Merit in 2009, following the restoration of titular honours by the New Zealand government.

References

External links
Lois Muir profile, nzhalloffame.co.nz; retrieved 13 March 2017.

1935 births
Living people
New Zealand women's basketball players
New Zealand netball players
New Zealand netball coaches
New Zealand netball administrators
New Zealand Officers of the Order of the British Empire
Dames Companion of the New Zealand Order of Merit
People educated at Otago Girls' High School
People from Mataura
Sporting dames
New Zealand national netball team coaches
People educated at Gore High School
1963 World Netball Championships players